Sapium macrocarpum is a species of flowering plant in the family Euphorbiaceae. It is native to Mexico and Central America.

References

Hippomaneae
Flora of Mexico
Flora of Central America
Taxonomy articles created by Polbot
Taxobox binomials not recognized by IUCN